Hart Hanson (born July 26, 1957) is an American-born television writer and producer, as well as an author. He is best known as the creator, executive producer, and writer of the TV series Bones.

Biography
Hanson's family moved to Canada when he was a child. He received a B.A. from the University of Toronto and a MFA from the University of British Columbia, where he taught briefly. Hanson moved into Canadian television in the early 1990s, writing on a variety of dramas including Neon Rider,The Odyssey and Traders. He would jump to American productions later that decade, working on The Outer Limits and Stargate SG-1 among others.

Bones was developed during the latter part of the pitching season of 2004 when 20th Century Fox approached Hanson. Hanson was asked to meet Barry Josephson, who had purchased the rights to produce a documentary on the forensic anthropologist Kathy Reichs. Hanson would later also create and write its spinoff, The Finder. 

In February 2013, Entertainment Weekly reported that Hanson would be writing about an "overweight, offensive cop" on FOX's television show, Backstrom. 

Hanson wrote The Driver, a novel released by Dutton on August 8, 2017, and named by The New York Times as one of the best crime novels of 2017. It centers on limo driver and war veteran Michael Skellig, who protects a sports mogul from assassins.

In 2019, Hanson joined a host of other writers in firing their agents as part of the WGA's stand against the ATA and the practice of packaging.

He considers himself a lapsed Catholic.

Filmography
 African Skies (1991), Writer
 Candles, Snow & Mistletoe (1993), Writer
 Trust in Me (1994), Writer
 Guitarman (1994), Writer
 Whale Music (1994), Story editor 
 Nobody's Business (1995), Writer
 Expert Witness (2003), Executive producer

Television
 Neon Rider (1991), Writer
 The Odyssey (1992–1994), Writer, director, story editor
 Road to Avonlea (1992–1996), Writer
 Ready Or Not (1993), Writer
 North of 60 (1994–1996), Writer
 Street Legal (1994), Writer
 Trust in Me (1994), Associate Producer
 Traders (1996–2000), Writer, supervising producer
 The Outer Limits (1997), writer
 Stargate SG-1 (1997–1999), writer
 Cupid (1998–1999), Writer, consulting/supervising producer
 Snoops (1999), Co-executive producer
 Judging Amy (2000–2003), Writer, consulting producer, executive producer
 Joan of Arcadia (2003–2004), Writer, consulting producer
 Bones (2005–2017), Creator, writer, executive producer 
 The Finder (2012), Creator, writer. executive producer
 Backstrom (2014), Creator, writer, executive producer

Fiction
The Driver: A Novel (2017)

Awards and nominations
Hanson has won 4 Gemini Awards. He was awarded Austin Film Festival's Outstanding Television Award in 2011.

References

External links

Hart Hanson's Twitter feed

1957 births
Living people
American expatriates in Canada
Television producers from California
American soap opera writers
American male television writers
Canadian Screen Award winners
People from Burlingame, California
Showrunners
University of Toronto alumni
University of British Columbia alumni
Writers from the San Francisco Bay Area
Screenwriters from California